A Fazenda 6 was the sixth season of the Brazilian reality television series A Fazenda which premiered on Sunday, June 23, 2013, at 10:30 p.m. on RecordTV.

The season was officially confirmed since 2011 as part of a millionaire contract between Strix Television and RecordTV, which guaranteed seasons until 2019. A Fazenda 6 was officially confirmed on August 29, 2012, during the season finale of A Fazenda 5.

Britto Junior reprised his hosting stints for the show. Cris Couto was replaced by journalist Juliana Camargo as the sponsored competitions host. Gianne Albertoni made her debut as the show's new special correspondent, replacing Celso Cavallini.

The grand prize was of R$2 million without tax allowances, with a brand new car offered to the runner-up.

On September 29, 2013, model Bárbara Evans won the competition with 54.87% of the public vote over parliamentary adviser & lawyer Denise Rocha (41.28%) and actor Marcos Oliver (3.85%).

Production

Overview
Pre-production started in February 2013. Record began casting for A Fazenda 6 once filming for Fazenda de Verão (Summer Farm) was completed.

Cast
The season featured sixteen new celebrities. Among them are three celebrities who are relatives of past contestants: Bárbara Evans is the daughter of TV host Monique Evans (from seasons 3 and 4), Mateus Verdelho is the ex-husband of model Dani Bolina (from season 4) and Márcio Duarte is the twin brother of singer Vavá (from season 5).

Contestants
Biographical information according to Record official series site, plus footnoted additions.
(ages stated are at time of contest)

Future appearances
In 2016, Scheila Carvalho appeared in Saltibum 3, she finished as runner-up.

In 2017, Rita Cadillac returned to compete in A Fazenda 9, she finished in 5th place in the competition.

In 2017, Yudi Tamashiro appeared in Dancing Brasil 2, he won the competition.

In 2018, Bárbara Evans appeared in Dancing Brasil 3, she finished in 13th place in the competition.

The game

Key Power
Since Season 5, contestants compete to win the Key Power each week. The Key Power holder is the only contestant who can open the mystery box located at the Farm. However, opening the box will unleash either a good consequence or a bad consequence at the nomination process. The Key Holder's choice is marked in bold.

From week 10, sheep team for being the team with the most members to date, won a box with a lot of instructions. The instructions are being revealed during this week.

Results

Voting history

Notes

Ratings and reception

Brazilian ratings
All numbers are in points and provided by Kantar Ibope Media.

 Each point represents 62.000 households in São Paulo.

References

External links
 Official Site 

2013 Brazilian television seasons
A Fazenda